Julie Mathilde Morrow Deforest ( – ) was an American impressionist painter. 

She earned a bachelor's degree in English from Wellesley College in 1904 and a master's degree in literature from Columbia University in 1906. She studied art under Jonas Lie, Charles Webster Hawthorne, and John F. Carlson.

For twenty years, she taught English at Irving High School and Wadleigh High School at New York City while painting and exhibiting in her free time.  In 1929, she married Cornelius Wortendyke DeForest, her newly divorced first cousin and a wealthy utility executive in Cincinnati, Ohio.  She relocated to Cincinnati and was able to devote herself to painting full time.

Her work focused on brightly colored impressionist landscapes.  After visits to California and Colorado she began to focus on areas of the Western US in her work of the 1930s, including the Rocky Mountains.

At the age of 92, she published a book of poetry, Belfry Chimes and Other Rimes (1974).

Julie Morrow Deforest died on 22 December 1979 in Glendale, Ohio.

References 

Created via preloaddraft
1882 births
1979 deaths
American women painters
American Impressionist painters
Wellesley College alumni
Columbia Graduate School of Arts and Sciences alumni
19th-century American painters
20th-century American painters